Lǐ Nǎi (李迺) (750? – ?) was a Tang dynasty prince and Tang Daizong's ninth son. His mother's identity is unknown.

In the year 779 he was enfeoffed as Prince of Yi (益王).

Tang dynasty imperial princes
Year of birth uncertain